The Sorne Hill Wind Farm is a wind farm located in Buncrana, Inishowen County Donegal, Ireland. The development was completed in 2006 and is operated by Bord Gáis Energy.

Turbines
Phase 1 of the farm has 16 gearless wind turbines, type Enercon E-70 2 [MW] with a 64-metre hub height and 71 metre rotor diameter giving a total capacity of 32 megawatts.

Phase 2 of the farm, which is an additional 6.9 MW from three Enercon E-70 2.3 MW turbines, were installed in the Autumn of 2007. This made brought the capacity of Sorne Hill Wind Farm to 38 MW.

References

Wind farms in the Republic of Ireland
Buildings and structures in County Donegal